The following is a list of released songs recorded and performed by Aerosmith.

References

External links
 

 
Aerosmith